Louth United F.C. was a football club from Louth, Lincolnshire. They became defunct in 2007 after running into severe financial difficulties. Louth Town F.C. took over the running of all junior sides and no senior teams exist in the name of Louth United.  Founded in 1947, from a merger of Louth Nats and Louth Town, they had been members of the Northern Counties East League and the Central Midlands League Premier Division, but in 2007 dropped down to the Lincolnshire League.

Louth United were based at their new home, Marshlands, which was developed and opened in 2008. This facility is now boarded up.

External links
Sills & Betteridge Solicitors Lincolnshire Football League FA Website

Defunct football clubs in England
Defunct football clubs in Lincolnshire
Association football clubs established in 1947
Association football clubs disestablished in 2007
1947 establishments in England
2007 disestablishments in England
Louth, Lincolnshire
Central Midlands Football League
Northern Counties East Football League